VfL Wolfsburg dropped off the pace for the second season running. A successful start to the season saw Wolfsburg running first in the league, looking like strong contenders, but as the season processed, the form dropped, and at the end of the season the team had lost one more match than they had won, surprisingly dropping off the top half of the table. Manager Eric Gerets left after one season in charge, and was replaced by former Borussia Mönchengladbach manager Holger Fach.

Players

First-team squad
Squad at end of season

Left club during season

VfL Wolfsburg II

Results

Bundesliga

Top Scorers
  Thomas Brdarić – 12
  Martin Petrov – 12 
  Diego Klimowicz – 7
  Pablo Thiam – 6
  Andrés D'Alessandro – 3

References

VfL Wolfsburg seasons
Wolfsburg